The 2014–15 season was Leicester City F.C.'s 110th season in the English football league system and their 47th (non-consecutive) season in the top tier of English football. They participated in the 2014–15 Premier League, their first time in Premier League in ten years, having been promoted from the Championship as champions. They also participated in the 2014–15 FA Cup and 2014–15 Football League Cup.

The season saw Leicester finish 14th in the Premier League, securing another top flight season. Despite the club being marooned at the bottom of the table for four-and-a-half months between late November and mid-April, the Foxes managed to put together a run of seven wins from their last nine fixtures to survive comfortably.

Pre-season events
Note: This section does not include close season transfers or pre-season match results, which are listed in their own sections below.

2 July 2014 – Matty James signs a four-year contract extension until the summer of 2018.
4 July 2014 – Wes Morgan signs a three-year contract extension until the summer of 2017.
9 July 2014 – David Nugent signs a two-year contract extension until the summer of 2016.
11 July 2014 – Alie Sesay signs a one-year contract extension until the summer of 2015.
11 July 2014 – Liam Moore signs a three-year contract extension until the summer of 2017.
11 July 2014 – Jeff Schlupp signs a three-year contract extension until the summer of 2017.

Kit and sponsorship

Kit Supplier – Puma
Sponsor – King Power

Friendlies

Events
Note:This section does not include transfers or match results, which are listed in their own sections below.
11 July 2014 – Jamie Vardy signs a four-year contract extension until the summer of 2018.
29 October 2014 – Andy King signs a four-year contract extension until the summer of 2018.
4 June 2015 – Marcin Wasilewski signs a one-year contract extension until the summer of 2016.
29 June 2015 – Jeff Schlupp signs a four-year contract extension until the summer of 2019.

Players and staff

2014–15 squad

2014–15 backroom staff

Transfers

In

Loans in

Loans out

Released

Competitions

Premier League

League table

Results summary

Results by matchday

Matches
The fixtures for the 2014–15 season were announced on 18 June 2014 at 9am.

FA Cup

Football League Cup

As a Premier League club not participating in European club competitions, Leicester City entered the 2014–15 League Cup in the second round. The Foxes were drawn at home against Shrewsbury Town, with the game being played on 26 August. Leicester's League Cup campaign was short-lived as the League Two side recorded a shock 1–0 victory.

Awards

Club awards
At the end of the season, Leicester's annual award ceremony, including categories voted for by the players and backroom staff, the supporters and the supporters club, saw the following players recognised for their achievements for the club throughout the 2014–15 season.

Divisional awards

Club statistics
All data from LCFC.com

Appearances
Starts + Substitute appearances.
Italics indicates loan player.
Asterisks indicates player left mid-season.
Hash symbol indicates player retired mid-season.

|}

Goalscorers

Disciplinary record

Ranking based on 1 point for a yellow card and 3 points for a red card.

Captains
Last Updated: 26 May 2015

Suspensions

 * Konchesky's red card vs. Aston Villa was rescinded on appeal.

Penalties

Overall seasonal record
Note: Games which are level after extra-time and are decided by a penalty shoot-out are listed as draws.

References

Leicester City F.C. seasons
Leicester City